The Garwood Public Schools is a community public school district that serves students in pre-kindergarten through eighth grade from Garwood, in Union County, New Jersey, United States.

As of the 2018–19 school year, the district, comprised of one school, had an enrollment of 386 students and 30.4 classroom teachers (on an FTE basis), for a student–teacher ratio of 12.7:1.

The district is classified by the New Jersey Department of Education as being in District Factor Group "DE", the fifth-highest of eight groupings.

Public school students in ninth through twelfth grades attend Arthur L. Johnson High School in neighboring Clark as part of a sending/receiving relationship with the Clark Public School District. As of the 2018–19 school year, the high school had an enrollment of 717 students and 66.0 classroom teachers (on an FTE basis), for a student–teacher ratio of 10.9:1.

History
Garwood had been a constituent municipality of the Union County Regional High School District, together with Berkeley Heights, Clark, Kenilworth, Mountainside and Springfield Township. Established in 1937, the dissolution of the district in 1997 left Garwood without its own high school, which resulted in the establishment of the sending relationship with the Clark Public School District.

Schools 
Lincoln School served 379 students for pre-kindergarten to eighth grade in the 2018–19 school year.
Mary Emmons, Principal

Administration
Core members of the district's administration are:
Dr. Teresa Quigley, Superintendent
Ana Pfalzgraf, Business Administrator / Board Secretary

Board of education
The district's board of education, comprised of nine members, sets policy and oversees the fiscal and educational operation of the district through its administration. As a Type II school district, the board's trustees are elected directly by voters to serve three-year terms of office on a staggered basis, with three seats up for election each year held (since 2012) as part of the November general election. The board appoints a superintendent to oversee the day-to-day operation of the district.

References

External links 
Garwood Public Schools

Garwood Public Schools, National Center for Education Statistics

Garwood, New Jersey
New Jersey District Factor Group DE
School districts in Union County, New Jersey